The 2017–18 Loyola Marymount Lions women's basketball team represented Loyola Marymount University in the 2017–18 NCAA Division I women's basketball season. The Lions, led by sixth year head coach Charity Elliott, played their homes games at the Gersten Pavilion and were members of the West Coast Conference. They finished the season 19–11, 11–7 in WCC play to finish in a tie for third place. They lost in the quarterfinals of the WCC women's tournament to San Francisco. Despite having 19 wins, they were not invited to a postseason tournament.

Previous season
They finished the season 14–16, 9–9 in WCC play to finish in a tie for fifth place. They lost in the quarterfinals of the WCC women's tournament to San Francisco.

Roster

Schedule

|-
!colspan=12 style=| Exhibition

|-
!colspan=12 style=| Non-conference regular season

|-
!colspan=12 style=| WCC regular season

|-
!colspan=12 style=| WCC Women's Tournament

See also
 2017–18 Loyola Marymount Lions men's basketball team

References

Loyola Marymount Lions women's basketball seasons
Loyola Marymount
Loyola Marymount basketball, women
Loyola Marymount basketball, women
Loyola Marymount basketball, women
Loyola Marymount basketball, women